The Lumbermen's Building (also known as the Oregon Trail Building) is an office building located at 333 SW Fifth Avenue in Downtown Portland, Oregon. It was listed on the National Register of Historic Places on September 12, 1996.

See also
 National Register of Historic Places listings in Southwest Portland, Oregon

References

External links
 

1909 establishments in Oregon
Chicago school architecture in Oregon
Buildings designated early commercial in the National Register of Historic Places
National Register of Historic Places in Portland, Oregon
Office buildings completed in 1909
Portland Historic Landmarks
Southwest Portland, Oregon